Anthimos V (Greek: Ἄνθιμος Ε'), (1779 – 12 June 1842) was Ecumenical Patriarch of Constantinople for thirteen months from 1841 to 1842. He was born in Raidestos (Tekirdağ) and served as Metropolitan of Agathoupolis between 1815 and 1821, Anchialos between 1821 and 1831, and Kyzikos between 1831 and 1841. He was appointed Ecumenical Patriarch when Patriarch Anthimos IV was dismissed by Ottoman Sultan Abdülmecid I.

He died in 1842 and was succeeded by Germanos IV.

References
Ecumenical Patriarchate: Anthimos V

1779 births
1842 deaths
People from Tekirdağ
Metropolitans of Anchialos
Bishops of Cyzicus
19th-century Ecumenical Patriarchs of Constantinople